Emanuele Chiapasco (27 July 1930 – 1 January 2021) was an Italian baseball player, sporting director, and entrepreneur. He was one of the pioneers of Italian baseball and served as CEO of department store chain Standa.

References

1930 births
2021 deaths
Italian baseball players
Italian Baseball League players